Muhammad Fatchurohman (born 28 June 1995), also known as Muhammad Fatchu Rochman or Fatchu Rochman, is an Indonesian professional footballer who plays as a full-back for Liga 1 club Bhayangkara.

Club career

Early career
Fatchurohman playing football since he was a child. He started his junior debut in SSB Naga Gempol in Pasuruan. In 2010, he joined Persekap Pasuruan. And he played in Indonesia U-19 who coached by Indra Sjafri.

Persebaya Bhayangkara
In 2015, he joined Persebaya ISL (Bhayangkara) with Evan Dimas, Ilham Armaiyn, Putu Gede Juni Antara, Zulfiandi, Hargianto, and Sahrul Kurniawan. he was contracted for four years.

Career statistics

Club

Honours

Club
Bhayangkara
 Liga 1: 2017

International
Indonesia U-19
 AFF U-19 Youth Championship: 2013

References

External links
 
 
 
 

1995 births
Living people
Indonesian footballers
People from Pasuruan
Persebaya Surabaya players
Bhayangkara F.C. players
Liga 2 (Indonesia) players
Liga 1 (Indonesia) players
Indonesia youth international footballers
Sportspeople from East Java
Association football defenders